Louis Byrne Slichter (May 19, 1896 – March 25, 1978) was an American physicist and geophysicist who directed the Institute of Geophysics at UCLA.

Slichter was notable for, among other things, earth tides research, submarine detection, development of three-component short-period seismographs, studies of the earth temperature distribution, and the invention of a number of important geophysical devices. Slichter Foreland peninsula in Antarctica is named after him. The Institute of Geophysics building in UCLA where he used to work as a director of the Institute has been named Slichter Hall. He was a member of the National Academy of Sciences and the chair of the Academy's Geophysics Section.
He was also a fellow of the American Academy of Arts and Sciences, a fellow of the American Physical Society, and a fellow of the American Geophysical Union. The New York Times called Slichter a "widely honored pioneer in the earth sciences". The National Academy of Sciences called him "one of the foremost geophysicists of the twentieth century, an outstanding leader, scholar, and teacher". UCLA called him "the world leader in the analysis of the solid earth tides".

Family 
Louis Slichter was the son of the mathematician Charles S. Slichter, brother of economist Sumner Slichter, and uncle of physicist Charles P. Slichter.  His sister-in-law was the biochemist Mary Van Rensselaer Buell.

Chronology 
 May 19, 1896 born in Madison, Wisconsin
 1917: BA, University of Wisconsin–Madison
 1920: AM, University of Wisconsin–Madison
 1922: PhD in physics, University of Wisconsin–Madison
 1932–1945: Massachusetts Institute of Technology, Professor of Geophysics
 1944: elected to the National Academy of Sciences
 1945–1947: University of Wisconsin–Madison, Professor of Geophysics
 1946 Presidential Certificate of Merit (1946)
 1946 Rockefeller Foundation Fellowship
 1947 Director of the Institute of Geophysics, Professor of Geophysics, UCLA
 1959 an honorary life membership in the Society of Exploration Geophysicists
 1960 the Jackling Award of the American Institute of Mining and Metallurgical Engineers
 1960 the chair of Geophysics Section at the National Academy of Sciences
 1963-1978 Professor Emeritus, UCLA
 1966 Dedication of Slichter Hall at UCLA
 1967 Honorary D.Sc., University of Wisconsin
 1966 the William Bowie Medal of the American Geophysical Union
 1969 Honorary LL.D., UCLA
 March 25, 1978 dies Los Angeles Medical Center at UCLA

References

External links

1896 births
1978 deaths
American geophysicists
University of California, Los Angeles faculty
University of Wisconsin–Madison faculty
University of Wisconsin–Madison alumni
Members of the United States National Academy of Sciences
Scientists from Madison, Wisconsin
Fellows of the American Geophysical Union